The Esploratore class  is a series of four coastal patrol boats of the Italian Navy. They were designed and built specifically for use by the Multinational Force and Observers (MFO) peace-keeping mission in the Sinai (Red Sea). The mission is to guarantee freedom of navigation in the Straits of Tiran, safeguard human life at sea and protect the marine environment. 
Compared to the Alberi class they replaced, these ships feature lighter displacement, improved speed, longer range, and a crew requirement reduced by 40%.

Ships

References

External links 

Patrol vessels of the Italian Navy
Ships built in Italy
Patrol ship classes
Multinational Force and Observers